Samoa men's national softball team is the national team for Samoa.  The team competed at the 2004 ISF Men's World Championship in Christchurch, New Zealand where they finished sixth.

References

Men's national softball teams
S
Men's sport in Samoa
Softball in Samoa